The 1968 World Cup took place 14–17 November at the Olgiata Golf Club in Rome, Italy. It was the 16th World Cup event, which was named the Canada Cup until 1966 and changed its name to the World Cup in 1967. The tournament was a 72-hole stroke play team event with 42 teams.  The third round on Saturday was interrupted by hail and rain storm, with six teams still on the course and play was resumed early Sunday. Each team consisted of two players from a country. The combined score of each team determined the team results. The Canadian team of Al Balding and George Knudson won by two strokes ahead of the United States team of Julius Boros and Lee Trevino. The individual competition was won by Balding, five strokes ahead of Roberto Bernardini, Italy. This was the first team victory for Canada in the event, which was founded in Canada in 1953.

Teams

(a) denotes amateur

Scores
Team

International Trophy

Sources:

References

World Cup (men's golf)
Golf tournaments in Italy
Sports competitions in Rome
World Cup
World Cup golf